Johnny Glynn ( 1917 – 10 January 1959) was President of the Irish Rugby Football Union.

Glynn was a native of Williamsgate Street, Galway. He played rugby for Galwegians and Connacht, winning twelve caps, and became a well-known referee. He also served as president of his local club in 1958-59.

His sudden death, at the age of 46, led to the two clubs erecting a memorial trophy in his name known as the Glynn Cup, which would be played for between the clubs every Saint Patrick's Day.

References

External links
 https://web.archive.org/web/20071119103005/http://www.irishrugby.ie/300_383.php

People from Galway (city)
Rugby union players from County Galway
Irish rugby union players
Connacht Rugby players
Galwegians RFC players
Irish rugby union referees
1910s births
1959 deaths

Year of birth uncertain